Dess railway station was opened on 2 December 1859 on the Deeside Extension Railway and served the rural area around Dess House and estate from 1859 to 1966 as an intermediate station on the Deeside Railway that ran from Aberdeen (Joint) to Ballater.

History 

The station was opened in 1859 on the Deeside branch by the Deeside Extension Railway and from the start its services were operated by the Deeside Railway. Later it became part of the GNoSR and at grouping merged with the London and North Eastern Railway. It stood 29.5 miles (47.5 km) from Aberdeen and 13.75 miles (22 km) from Ballater. It was closed to passengers on 28 February 1966. The line has been lifted and sections form part of the Deeside Way long-distance footpath. The station was unstaffed from circa 1964, if not earlier, when goods services were withdrawn from the line.

Infrastructure

The station had a single stone built platform on this single track section of the branch. The stationmaster's house, ticket office and waiting room were situated on the up side of the line, consisting of a rough-cast and brick built single-storey structure, with round-headed windows at the front and a central covered area. It was similar in design to those at Lumphanan, Glassel, etc. The single freight siding was lifted prior to the cessation of freight services on the line in 1964.

In 1900 a railway agent's house, not built until after 1867, stood to the west of the station house with access to the platform and a single siding with a loading ramp and weighing machine was located opposite the platform with the goods yard accessed off the nearby road.

Services
The line was chosen to trial the battery multiple unit and once introduced on 21 April 1958 the train service was doubled to six trains a day and in addition a Sunday service was reinstated. Dess, unlike Cambus O'May was not a request stop, however not all services were timetabled to call at this remotely located station.

The site today 
The much enlarged main station building and its platform survive as does the old railway agent's house, both as private dwellings. The Royal Deeside Railway is located at Milton of Crathes some distance down the line towards Aberdeen.

Aboyne Curling Pond Station
Aboyne Curling Pond railway station, also known as Loch of Aboyne Platform or Curlers' Platform was a nearby private station opened on the Deeside Extension Railway for the use of the curlerwho played on the nearby Loch of Aboyne

References

Sources
 
 Maxtone, Graham and Cooper, Mike (2018). Then and Now on the Great North. V.1. GNoSR Association. .

External links 
Views of the station house
Film of the station and the Deeside line.

Disused railway stations in Aberdeenshire
Beeching closures in Scotland
Former Great North of Scotland Railway stations
Railway stations in Great Britain opened in 1859
Railway stations in Great Britain closed in 1966
1966 disestablishments in Scotland